Apotrepus is a genus of true weevils in the beetle family Curculionidae. There are about 10 described species in Apotrepus.

Species
These 10 species belong to the genus Apotrepus:
 Apotrepus delauneyi Hustache, 1932
 Apotrepus densicollis Casey, 1892
 Apotrepus dufaui Hustache, 1932
 Apotrepus enigmaticus Hustache, 1932
 Apotrepus guadelupensis Hustache, 1932
 Apotrepus hypocritus Hustache, 1932
 Apotrepus puncticollis Boheman, 1838
 Apotrepus sulcatifrons Hustache, 1932
 Apotrepus sulcatirostris Hustache, 1932
 Apotrepus vitraci Hustache, 1932

References

Further reading

 
 
 

Cossoninae
Articles created by Qbugbot